Madison is a town in Madison County, New York, United States. The population was 3,008 at the 2010 census.

The Town of Madison contains a village also named Madison. The town is near the eastern border of the county.

History 

Settlement began circa 1794. The town was formed in 1807 from a portion of the Town of Hamilton. Madison is well known because of the Madison Wind Farm, built in 2000. Darwin D. Martin, a Larkin Company executive, was born in Bouckville in 1865.

Geography
The northern and eastern town lines are the border of Oneida County.  US Route 20 passes across the town.

According to the United States Census Bureau, the town has a total area of 41.4 square miles (107.2 km2), of which 40.9 square miles (105.9 km2)  is land and 0.5 square mile (1.3 km2)  (1.23%) is water.

U.S. Route 20, conjoined with New York State Route 12B forms an east-west highway across the town.

Demographics

As of the census of 2000, there were 2,801 people, 1,129 households, and 779 families residing in the town.  The population density was 68.5 people per square mile (26.4/km2).  There were 1,325 housing units at an average density of 32.4 per square mile (12.5/km2).  The racial makeup of the town was 97.82% White, 0.32% Black or African American, 0.11% Native American, 0.61% Asian, 0.14% Pacific Islander, 0.21% from other races, and 0.79% from two or more races. Hispanic or Latino of any race were 0.75% of the population.

There were 1,129 households, out of which 30.4% had children under the age of 18 living with them, 57.0% were married couples living together, 8.4% had a female householder with no husband present, and 31.0% were non-families. 23.5% of all households were made up of individuals, and 9.7% had someone living alone who was 65 years of age or older.  The average household size was 2.47 and the average family size was 2.93.

In the town, the population was spread out, with 24.8% under the age of 18, 7.4% from 18 to 24, 28.0% from 25 to 44, 25.7% from 45 to 64, and 14.1% who were 65 years of age or older.  The median age was 39 years. For every 100 females, there were 100.8 males.  For every 100 females age 18 and over, there were 97.1 males.

The median income for a household in the town was $35,889, and the median income for a family was $41,630. Males had a median income of $29,487 versus $23,750 for females. The per capita income for the town was $18,468.  About 9.6% of families and 13.0% of the population were below the poverty line, including 19.5% of those under age 18 and 6.7% of those age 65 or over.

Communities and locations in the Town of Madison 
Bouckville – A hamlet near the western town line on Route 20. The Chenango Canal Summit Level and Coolidge Stores Building are listed on the National Register of Historic Places.
Durfee Corners – A location in the southeastern part of the town.
Lake Moraine – A lake south of Madison village.
Madison – The Village of Madison on Route 20.
Madison Center – A hamlet southeast of Madison village.
Sigby Corners – A hamlet in the southern part of the town.
Solsville – A hamlet north of Madison village and home of the ever-elusive Madison Sasquatch.

Notable person

 Thomas Bones (1842–1929), land developer in this area

References

External links
  Early history of the Town of Madison

Syracuse metropolitan area
Towns in Madison County, New York